Joe Romersa is an American musician, composer, voice actor, and music producer.

Romersa started his career as a drummer, but early on he branched out into sound engineering. As Romersa tells it, "After a tragic early tour I did at age 19 which left me homeless sleeping on a park bench in New Jersey, I had to find a way to make money and still be close to what I love; music." Romersa later studied sound engineering. Combining his fledgling career as a professional musician with the more stable income of sound engineering allowed Romersa to hone his craft as both a drummer/percussionist and as a sound engineer.

Career

Early career
Romersa started touring as the drummer for the Marc Tanner Band. On April 19, 1979, they would open for Firefall, at the Palace Theater in Cleveland Ohio. The Marc Tanner Band also opened for Jefferson Starship. Romersa was a drummer, percussionist, and composer on Tanner's second album, Temptation, along with guitarist Ritchie Zito and bassist Ron Edwards.

Soy Cowboy
While working in the studio, a chance meeting with keyboardist and songwriter Vincent Nicoletti would result in the band Soy Cowboy with its "Thai Western" sound. Romersa was brought in as a drummer and sound engineer, and eventually became lead vocalist. After their first recordings received airplay by Los Angeles radio personality Tom Schnabel of KCRW-FM (89.9), the band caught the attention of then-art student Tarsem Singh. In 1990, Singh would produce Soy Cowboy's only music video for their song "Lily Pads and Rock Cod". Soy Cowboy's first album, First Time Again, was produced in 1991 but it was not released to the public. The album would later be released in 2009, by Shadow Box Studio. Their second album, 2012, was produced and released in 2012. As noted by Schnabel, "The band got moderate airplay on U.S. radio, but in England briefly jumped to the top of the charts."

Sound engineering

Romersa was both a drummer and engineer on John Prine's 1991 album The Missing Years. He would go on to work with Carlene Carter on her 1993 country music album Little Love Letters as the drummer, percussionist, engineer and backup vocalist, along with bassist Howie Epstein and keyboardist Benmont Tench. Little Love Letters would rise to No. 35 on the Top Country Albums chart and included the No. 3 hit "Every Little Thing" and two top 100 songs; "I Love You 'Cause I Want To" (#50) and "Unbreakable Heart" (#51). Romersa's daughter, Reyna, would make her video debut in "I Love You 'Cause I Want To".

In the late 1980s, Romersa began working with eden ahbez. Romersa and ahbez worked together until the latter's death in 1995.

Voice Acting
In 1994, Romersa started engineering, voice acting, and ADR directing on anime and video game projects, which led to his work on Silent Hill. Romersa would go on to work as music supervisor on Silent Hill 3, 4: The Room, and Homecoming. He also wrote the lyrics, and contributed vocals to "Hometown" and "Cradle of Forest".

Return to music
One of Romersa's projects as a producer was singer Alana Sweetwater's 2004 self-titled debut album. Her single from that album, "Song of Love", was featured on the original Showtime series The Real L Word. Romersa was also a musician on the album and sound engineer.

Romersa released his first album as a solo artist in 2017, Enough. Written and composed by Romersa, Enough includes tracks by fellow musicians including Laurence Juber ("Love, and You"), Prescott Niles ("Enough," "Humans Doing Angels Work," "Soldier of Love"), and Jeff Jourard ("Give Our Money Back").

Romersa's musical inspirations include The Beatles, Ludwig van Beethoven, John Cage, Jimi Hendrix, Louis Prima, Pink Floyd, Led Zeppelin, Karlheinz Stockhausen, Emerson, Lake, and Palmer, The Move, and David Bowie.

Discography

Mainstream albums

Indie albums

Acting

Anime voice-over 
Akira as Joker
Armitage III as Big Thug
Bastard!! as Priest C
Battle Athletes as Claus (Ep. 4); Hans (Ep. 4)
Battle Athletes Victory as Additional Voices
Black Jack as Mob Boss
Black Magic M-66 as Additional Voices
Blood: The Last Vampire as David
Code Geass: Lelouch of the Rebellion as Ryouga Senba
Cowboy Bebop as Abdul Hakim
Dual! Parallel Trouble Adventure
El Hazard: The Magnificent World as Driver (Ep. 3)
El Hazard 2 – The Magnificent World as Additional Voices
El Hazard: The Alternative World as Additional Voices
El Hazard: The Wanderers as Additional Voices
Gate Keepers as Hippie
Ghost in the Shell as Truck Driver (as Joe Michaels)
Ghost in the Shell 2: Innocence as Crab Man, Undersea Cyborg Escort (Animaze Dub)
Ghost in the Shell: Stand Alone Complex: 2nd Gig as Coil Krasnov, Kitora Masoki
Ghost in the Shell: Stand Alone Complex: Solid State Society as Colonel Ka Gael, Security Cyborg
Hand Maid May as Additional Voices
Hyper Doll as Additional Voices
Lupin III: The Castle of Cagliostro as Gustav (Animaze Dub)
Macross Plus as Additional Voices
Mobile Suit Gundam: The Movie Trilogy as Gaia
Mobile Suit Gundam: The 08th MS Team as Hige, Doctor
Mobile Suit Gundam: The 08th MS Team – Miller's Report as Agent Jacob
Moldiver as Additional Voices
Ninja Scroll as Additional Voices
Ninku the Movie as Additional Voices
Orguss 02 as Additional Voices
Outlaw Star as Fake Shimi; Kyokan
Phantom Quest Corp as Additional Voices
Red Hawk – Weapon of Death as Additional Voices
Rurouni Kenshin as Merchant (Ep. 15); Politician (Ep. 15); Raiko
Sol Bianca: The Legacy as Additional Voices
Street Fighter II: The Animated Movie as Balrog (as Joe Michaels)
Street Fighter II V as Balrog (Animaze Dub)
Street Fighter Alpha as Zangief
The Big O as Nightingale Club Bouncer (Ep. 2), Repairman (Ep. 25)
The Legend of Black Heaven as Luke Yamada
The Wings of Honneamise as Air Force Member 4
They Were 11 as Knu
Trigun as Descartes

Video game roles 
Brave Fencer Musashi as Ben
NeverDead as Astaroth
Seven Samurai 20XX - Zex

Non-anime voice-over 
Big Rig Buddies as Smokey the Fire Truck (formerly)

Staff work 
Armitage III as ADR Engineer
Brave Fencer Musashi as Voice Director
Bushido Blade 2 as Digital Tracker (English voices)
The Castle of Cagliostro as Digital Tracker, English Adapter, Director (Manga Entertainment dub)
Dual! Paralle lunlun monogatari as Final Mixer, director
Ghost in the Shell as Digital Tracker (English voices)
Firefighter F.D.18 as English Dialogue Director
Front Mission 4 as Voice Director
Invisible Mom II as Music Supervisor
Lurking Fear as Dialogue Editor
Nano Breaker as ADR Director
The New Adventures of Captain Planet as Sound Designer
Reaper Tales as Sound Recordist
Resident Evil 5 as Sound Designer, Video Storyboard Artist
Shadow Warriors as Dialogue Editor
Silent Hill: Homecoming as Lyricist
Street Fighter Alpha as Writer, director
Suikoden IV as ADR Director
Timberwood Tales as Editor
Tollbooth as Dialogue Editor, ADR recordist
Wings of Honneamise as Dialogue Sound Engineer

References

External links 
Official website

Living people
American audio engineers
American male drummers
American male singer-songwriters
American male video game actors
American male voice actors
American multi-instrumentalists
American rock singers
American rock songwriters
American singer-songwriters
American voice directors
Grammy Award winners
Silent Hill
American sound designers
Year of birth missing (living people)
20th-century American drummers
20th-century American male musicians